This is a list of the oldest ships in the world which have survived to this day with exceptions to certain categories. The ships on this list which include warships, yachts, tall ships, and vessels recovered during archaeological excavations all date to 1918 or prior. Vessels listed are sorted by date of launching as most accurately known. Many of the ships in the "Build location" column were built for use in other countries by the United Kingdom, which in the mid to late 1800s was a dominant worldwide ship builder. A majority of ships on this list are found in museums, and include examples that are the last of their kind left in the world.

List criteria 
While this list includes the "oldest surviving" ships, many have since been restored, and/or reconstructed. Ships that have been exposed to the elements gradually deteriorate over time, thus no ship can be considered truly original due to part replacements during a ship's life. This leads to a known paradox called the "Ship of Theseus", making the definition of "original" unclear. An example is the : the original sank in 1820 and was raised and reconstructed three times. These extensive reconstructions left little of the original ship remaining (nonstructural items). Another separate issue is incomplete ships due to weathering conditions caused by their status as a former shipwreck, or by sheer neglect. One example is the ship Mary Rose, whose raised and preserved remains consist of only a partial hull. Those that remain underwater and intact are lumped into a separate category that focuses on shipwrecks, such as those found in the Black Sea. Many surviving old ships may also appear on other Wikipedia lists such as lightvessels. Many old lightvessels survive worldwide to this day, unlike ocean liners of which there are very few pre-World War II examples.

With these things in mind, the following are excluded 
Replicas – There is an article on ship replicas here.
Underwater wrecks – Lists of shipwrecks can be found here.
Ships made after 1918 – This is a list of "oldest" ships made up until the end of World War I and before 1919.

The following things are included in this page 
Ships on the National Historic Fleet are included.
Ships on the Sydney Heritage Fleet are included as well.
Reconstructed ships – "Restored" is fine as long as the ship retains its original features or some of its original features.
Wreckage – As long as they are restored in some way and put on display as a museum exhibit. All of the ships listed below include a fully intact or partially intact hull. Ships like the Lady Elizabeth are still considered to be surviving despite their current condition of not being preserved.

Legend 

N/A indicates that information is unavailable or yet to be evaluated.

Oldest ships

Before 800 AD

800–1400s AD

1500s–1859

1860–1889

1890–1909

1910–1918

Oldest surviving by category 
The following is a list of ships arranged by category. These include ships that are the oldest in the world by type and by function, they do not include ships known only for being the last of their kind. The cutoff date as with the list are ships constructed before 1919.

By type

By function

See also 

Museum ship
List of museum ships
List of ocean liners
List of cruise ships
List of schooners
List of large sailing yachts
List of clipper ships
List of large sailing vessels
List of ships

Notes

References 

Lists of sailing ships
Lists of ships